In Greek mythology, Anthas (Ancient Greek: Ἅνθας), also Anthes (Ἅνθης), was a son of Poseidon and Alcyone, and brother of Hyperes. The brothers were eponymous founders and first kings of the cities Hyperea and Anthea in a region they reigned over; later on these two cities were merged into the historical Troezen. Anthas was father of at least two sons, Aëtius and Dius, of whom Aëtius was the successor to both his father and uncle, and further co-ruled with Pittheus and Troezen. The descendants of Anthas through Aëtius reputedly founded colonies in Caria: Halicarnassus and Myndus, and accordingly the people of Halicarnassus were referred to by the poetic epithet Antheades 'descendants of Anthas'. Alternately, Halicarnassus was founded by Anthas himself. Anthas also was the presumed eponym of Anthedon, over which he was said to have reigned, and of Anthana in Laconia.

See also
Anthus

Notes

References 

 Pausanias, Description of Greece with an English Translation by W.H.S. Jones, Litt.D., and H.A. Ormerod, M.A., in 4 Volumes. Cambridge, MA, Harvard University Press; London, William Heinemann Ltd. 1918. . Online version at the Perseus Digital Library
 Pausanias, Graeciae Descriptio. 3 vols. Leipzig, Teubner. 1903.  Greek text available at the Perseus Digital Library.
 Stephanus of Byzantium, Stephani Byzantii Ethnicorum quae supersunt, edited by August Meineike (1790-1870), published 1849. A few entries from this important ancient handbook of place names have been translated by Brady Kiesling. Online version at the Topos Text Project.
 Strabo, The Geography of Strabo. Edition by H.L. Jones. Cambridge, Mass.: Harvard University Press; London: William Heinemann, Ltd. 1924. Online version at the Perseus Digital Library.
 Strabo, Geographica edited by A. Meineke. Leipzig: Teubner. 1877. Greek text available at the Perseus Digital Library.

Children of Poseidon
Demigods in classical mythology
Troezenian mythology